Steve Tandy (born 16 January 1980) is a Welsh rugby union former player and coach.
He played for Welsh region Ospreys for the majority of his career and went on to become head coach of the region after his retirement.
He is now defence coach at Scotland with a coaching role within the British and Irish Lions in 2021.

Playing career
Tandy played as an openside flanker for Neath RFC and the Ospreys.

Coaching career
While still a player, Tandy took his first coaching role within the Ospreys age-grade teams, and as coach of the U16s he won the WRU Age Grade Championship.

For the 2010–11 season, Tandy combined his playing role with the Ospreys with the head coach role at Bridgend RFC. He led the Ravens to the Division 1 title, with an incredible 96 points (just one defeat and one draw shy of an unbeaten season.) He then guided them into the Principality Premiership with victory over Glamorgan Wanderers 38–19 at the Cardiff Arms Park. He continued to coach Bridgend Ravens for season 2011/12, but retired from playing the game.

In December 2019, it was announced Tandy would be joining Scottish Rugby as defence coach for the national side.

References

External links
Ospreys profile
Wales profile
Newport 16 – 28 Neath

1980 births
Living people
Ospreys (rugby union) coaches
Ospreys (rugby union) players
Rugby union flankers
Rugby union players from Neath Port Talbot
Welsh rugby union coaches
Welsh rugby union players